S&P Dow Jones Indices LLC is a joint venture between S&P Global, the CME Group, and News Corp that was announced in 2011 and later launched in 2012.  It produces, maintains, licenses, and markets stock market indices as benchmarks and as the basis of investable products, such as exchange-traded funds (ETFs), mutual funds, and structured products. The company currently has employees in 15 cities worldwide, including New York, London, Frankfurt, Singapore, Hong Kong, Sydney, Beijing, and Dubai.

The company's best known indices are the S&P 500 and the Dow Jones Industrial Average (DJIA), which were created in 1957 and 1896, respectively. The company also manages the oldest index in use, the Dow Jones Transportation Index, created in 1882 by Charles Dow, the founder of The Wall Street Journal.

S&P Global (formerly McGraw Hill Financial, Inc.), owner of Standard & Poor's, controls 73% of the joint venture, CME Group owns 24.4% through its affiliates.

Indices defined
A market index follows a certain market and gives investors a single number to summarize its ups and downs. It enables the world's institutional (and retail) investors to track a market or market sector without having to aggregate the underlying components. It is a convenient way for someone interested in a broad, narrow, or extremely narrow group of securities to track them.

Pension funds and other money managers often use indexes as benchmarks. This means that "active" investors (those who pick various securities to buy and hold for their returns) track their own returns against a benchmark index (an index that typifies its market) to see if they are out- or under-performing that market. Investors who do not want to do this (those who buy into indexes or securities that use indexes as their basis) are called "passive" investors. They are known to link their portfolios to the broad market and do not try to outguess conventional market wisdom. Passive investors argue that almost no active investors can beat the overall markets in the long-term. This choice is described by a theory in investing called the efficient market hypothesis.

Indices by S&P Dow Jones
The DJI has over 130,000 indexes, although many are used by only relatively few people. Most are principally equity (stock) indexes but also contain fixed-income, futures, options, private equity, commodity, currency, bond, and other alternative asset class metrics. Dow Jones Indexes says that all its products are maintained according to clear, unbiased, and systematic methodologies that are fully integrated within index families.

DJI and Sustainable Asset Management (SAM), launched the Dow Jones Sustainability Indices in 1999.  These indexes track performance of sustainability-driven companies around the world. There are currently 70 DJSI licenses held by asset managers in 16 countries to manage a variety of financial products, including active and passive funds, certificates and segregated accounts.

DJI partnered with AIG to create the Dow Jones-AIG Commodity Index. It tracks trades on futures contracts for physical commodities, like energy (petroleum, gas), precious metals (gold, silver), industrial metals (zinc, copper), grains (corn, wheat), livestock (lean hogs, live cattle), among others.

UBS Securities LLC has acquired AIG Financial Product Corp.'s commodity business as of May 6, 2009. As such, the Dow Jones-AIG Commodity Indexes have been re-branded as the Dow Jones-UBS Commodity Indexes effective May 7, 2009.

The Dow Jones Select Dividend Indexes reflects the performance of leading dividend-yielding stocks. It includes global and regional indexes. It was DJI's first fundamentals-driven index.

Dow Jones Indexes also does "specialty" indexes for specific markets or interests. It has the Dow Jones U.S. Economic Stimulus Index, the Olympic-inspired Dow Jones Summer/Winter Games, the race-car centric Dow Jones Formula 1 Index and the Dow Jones Luxury Index, among others.

Companies can also request that specific indexes be created to suit their clients' interest or for publicity purposes. This is popular with smaller asset management and public relations firms.

Recent history
DJI launches an average of one index or index family per week. It often creates an index for a specific event (i.e. Dow Jones 2008 Summer Games Index, launched December 2007), a specific market (Dow Jones Luxury Index, launched June 2008), or a very small market (Dow Jones Cyprus Titans 10 Index). In some instances it cooperates with other entities to create a custom index (Barron's 400 Index, launched September 2007).

Dow Jones Industrial Average historical data (along with several other major indexes) is available from the company’s main site. The company also has a widely read quarterly newsletter called Insights that covers the industry.

In December 2020, DJI removed certain sanctioned companies with ties to the People's Liberation Army from its indices.

In January 2021, S&P Dow Jones Indices announced that, on February 1, 2021, or before, China National Offshore Oil Corp's (CNOOC) securities will be removed due to the US sanctions. In May 2021 the SEC fined the company for pausing data.

Research information
The company produces a quarterly news magazine called Insight. The company has topical Market Commentary videos, video interviews and press events for researchers, academia and market makers to use.

See also
Index (economics)
Dow Jones & Company
Dow Jones Sustainability Index
Sustainable Asset Management

References

External links

 
Joint ventures
Financial services companies based in New York City
American stock market indices
CME Group
Mass media companies